Sint Anna Bay (Dutch: Sint Annabaai) is a deep channel approximately one mile long and up to 1,000 feet wide, located on the island of Curaçao between the two parts of Willemstad, Punda and Otrobanda.

The bay opens into the Caribbean Sea at the southern end, and into the Schottegat lagoon/industrial area to the north.

References

Bodies of water of Curaçao
Channels
Willemstad